Athit Wisetsilp (born September 26, 1993) is a Thai professional footballer who plays as a central midfielder for Thai League 2 club Nakhon Si United.

International career

Athit won the AFF U-19 Youth Championship with Thailand U19, and played in 2012 AFC U-19 Championship.

International goals

Under-19

Honours

Domestic
Lamphun Warriors
Thai League 3: 2020–21

International
Thailand U-19
 AFF U-19 Youth Championship: 2011

External links
 Profile at Goal
https://us.soccerway.com/players/athit-wisetsilp/398585/

1993 births
Living people
Athit Wisetsilp
Athit Wisetsilp
Association football midfielders
Athit Wisetsilp
Athit Wisetsilp
Athit Wisetsilp
Athit Wisetsilp
Athit Wisetsilp
Athit Wisetsilp
Athit Wisetsilp
Nakhon Si United F.C. players